The 2008 United States Olympic trials for swimming events were held from June 29 to July 6 at the CenturyLink Center Omaha in Omaha, Nebraska. It was the qualifying meet for American swimmers who hoped to compete at the 2008 Summer Olympics in Beijing.

Results 
Key:

Men's events

Women's events

See also
United States at the 2008 Summer Olympics
United States Olympic Trials (swimming)
USA Swimming

References

External links
  2008 US Olympic swimming trials results by event at Omegatiming.com

United States Olympic trials
United States Summer Olympics Trials
Sports competitions in Omaha, Nebraska
Swimming Olympic trials